Troxell is a surname. Notable people with the surname include:

John Troxell, American football coach and former player
John W. Troxell (born  1964), former Senior Enlisted Advisor to the Chairman of the Joint Chief of Staffs
Richard Troxell, American operatic tenor

See also
Troxell-Steckel House